This is a list of major acts and legislation which were signed by Philippine President Rodrigo Duterte. It includes landmark bills which were passed during his presidency and lapsed into law.

Major acts and legislation

2016

2017

2018

2019

2020

2021

2022

Notes

See also
 List of executive orders by Rodrigo Duterte

References

External links
 

Presidency of Rodrigo Duterte